Totnes Castle is one of the best preserved examples of a Norman motte and bailey castle in England. It is situated in the town of Totnes on the River Dart in Devon. The surviving stone keep and curtain wall date from around the 14th century. From after the Norman Conquest of 1066 it was the caput of the Feudal barony of Totnes.

History 

The castle occupies a commanding position atop a large hill above the town, and guards the approach to three valleys.

The first castle on this site is believed to have been built by the Breton Juhel of Totnes (also known as Judhael) who was one of William the Conqueror's lieutenants. The feudal barony of Totnes was granted to him in 1068, and in order to cement his control over the area he constructed a fortification and founded Totnes Priory within the town. This first construction probably consisted of a wooden palisade and tower. On the death of King William I, Juhel lost his lands, possibly as a result of his support for the Rebellion of 1088. The feudal barony of Totnes was then granted to Roger de Nonant, whose descendants appear to have held it for the next three generations. Following this it came into the possession of William de Braose, 3rd Lord of Bramber, who is probably responsible for constructing the first stone shell keep and walls on the site.

By 1326, the castle had fallen into ruin and was under the control the de la Zouch family.
During this period a royal order was made for the repair of the fortifications. As a result, the castle was re-fortified with a new shell keep, using Devonian limestone and red sandstone, a stable was constructed and a constable appointed. Following the Wars of the Roses it once again fell into disrepair. The castle was occupied for a period during the Civil War but saw no notable action.

Preservation
Since 1984 the castle has been under the stewardship of English Heritage. The castle is a scheduled monument and a Grade I listed building.

See also 
 Castles in Great Britain and Ireland
 List of castles in England
 Grade I listed buildings in Devon
 Totnes Guildhall
 Totnes Museum

References

External links 

Totnes Castle information
In pictures: Totnes Castle - a Norman show of strength

1068 establishments in England
Grade I listed buildings in Devon
Castles in Devon
English Heritage sites in Devon
Totnes
Ruins in Devon
Motte-and-bailey castles